Pioda may refer to:

 Giovanni Battista Pioda, Swiss politician
 Punta Pioda, mountain in the Bregaglia Range of the Alps

See also
 Piode